Upham is a small village and civil parish in the south of England located in Hampshire approximately 7 miles south-east of Winchester .

The village
There is a small post office and a local primary school. The village is divided into two parts: Upham, centred on the church to the north, and Lower Upham, centred on the post office and main road. There are two pubs, the Brushmakers Arms and the Alma Inn. Other features include a village pond.

The country house The Holt, a Grade II-listed building,  was the longtime seat of the Shendley-Leavett family, and the home of John Alfred Leavett-Shendley, DL, High Sheriff of Hampshire  in 1985–1986 who married Alison Yvonne Cecil, daughter of Hon. Yvonne Cornwallis and Royal Navy Commander Henry Mitford Amherst Cecil, O.B.E., who served as a Navy Commander in both World Wars. It was also the home of Sir Robert Calder, a naval officer in the Napoleonic Wars, who died there in 1815. Calder is buried in the local churchyard.

There are marginal remains of a Late Roman period Villa in nearby Little Woodcotte, found in 1849.

Transport
Lower Upham is crossed by the B2177 road, formerly the A333 Winchester to Portsmouth road; there are no other main roads in the parish. There is a regular bus service to Winchester, Twyford, Colden Common, Bishop's Waltham and Fareham.

The parish is crossed by many trackways and paths including the Monarch's Way, Pilgrims' Trail and King's Way. In the south of the parish King's Way and the Pilgrims' Trail partly use the course of the former Roman road from Winchester to Portchester, which passes between Upham and Lower Upham.

Geology
Upham lies on the northern margin of the Paleogene deposits of the Hampshire Basin. The north of the parish is on chalk with the Lambeth Group and London Clay to the south.

References

External links
Upham Village Website

Villages in Hampshire